The Rural Municipality of Prairie Rose No. 309 is a rural municipality (RM) in the Canadian province of Saskatchewan within Census Division No. 10 and  Division No. 5. It is located in the central portion of the province.

History 
The RM of Prairie Rose No. 309 incorporated as a rural municipality on December 12, 1910.

Geography

Communities and localities 
The following urban municipalities are surrounded by the RM.

Villages
 Jansen

The following unincorporated communities are within the RM.

Localities
 Esk

Demographics 

Government 
The RM of Prairie Rose No. 309 is governed by an elected municipal council and an appointed administrator that meets on the second Wednesday of every month. The reeve of the RM is Darin Pedersen while its administrator is Melissa Dieno. The RM's office is located in Jansen.

References 

 
P
Division No. 10, Saskatchewan